America Abbayi is a 1987 Indian Telugu language, drama film directed by Singeetam Srinivasa Rao, written by J. Ramachandra Murthy and produced by D. Madhusudhana Rao. The film was primarily shot in the United States, most notably in the Midwest area, and surrounding landmarks such as the Hurley Medical Center, the Renaissance Center, the "Sri Venkateswara Swami Temple of Greater Chicago" in Aurora, Illinois, Cedar Point Amusement Park in Ohio, McLaren Flint, and Dow Gardens, Midland, Michigan.

Plot
The plot revolves around young Raja (Master Shravan Shankar), the son of an Indian American, medical doctor Jyotsna (Ashwini). Jyotsna works at the Hurley Medical Center and lives with her father Sivaram (Kaikala Satyanarayana) and younger sister Pratima.  Jytosna travels to India on a vacation, and meets her friend Sarada (Radhika Sarathkumar); while Sarada's father Raja Rao (Gummadi Venkateswara Rao) suffers a heart attack; Jyotsna is then introduced to Sarada's husband Shekhar (Charan Raj) a businessman who is into international trade.

Later, it is revealed that Raja is the son of Sarada, and her first husband Sudhakar (Chandra Mohan) who died in a road mishap on the day of their wedding. Subsequently, Jyotsna adopts Raja, and requests Sarada to get married and lead a normal life. Upon knowing this truth, Sarada's husband Shekhar vents out his frustration on Sarada for not revealing this before their wedding. In the meantime, Raja Rao's health deteriorates, and the family moves to the U.S. for Raja Rao's treatment with the help of Shekhar and Jyotsna. Raja Rao undergoes surgery in the U.S. and slowly recuperates. Pradeep (Rajasekhar) along with his friend (Y. G. Mahendran) work as Chauffeurs sponsored by Sivaram. Sivaram introduces Jyotsna to Pradeep, and they both fall in love. On the other hand, Shekhar moves to a different house with his wife Sarada.

In a shocking twist, on the night of a dinner party, Raja witnesses the murder of an unidentified woman by Shekhar in the backyard of Shekhar's new home. It is revealed that Shekhar is about to marry Rita (Elizabeth), an American (whose homicide young Raja witnessed), and they are into drug trafficking in the U.S. Later, when Pradeep confronts Shekhar about these events, and his agenda to kill Raja and divorce Sarada, so that Shekhar can take over the property deed of Raja,  Shekhar disagrees Pradeep's allegations. While Raja is performing a Telugu song at his school cultural event, Shekhar tries to shoot Raja, and in the ensuing fight Shekhar kills Sarada. The rest of the plot deals with how Pradeep and Jyotsna rescue Raja from the shackles of Shekhar.

Cast 
Master Shravan Shankar as Raja
Kaikala Satyanarayana as Sivaram
Rajasekhar as Pradeep
Charan Raj as Shekhar
Radhika Sarathkumar as Sarada
Gummadi as Raja Rao
Ashwini as Jyotsna
Y. G. Mahendran as Pradeep's friend

Soundtrack
The soundtrack composed by Saluri Rajeswara Rao with lyrics composed by veterans C. Narayana Reddy and Aarudhra; the classic track "Edesamegina Endukalidina" received cult following.

References

1987 films
Films shot in Andhra Pradesh
Indian thriller drama films
Films about women in the Indian diaspora
Films set in Michigan
Films about Indian Americans
Films shot in the United States
Films shot in Chicago
1980s Telugu-language films
Indian films set in New York City
Films directed by Singeetam Srinivasa Rao